Tinnitus is the perception of sound when no corresponding external sound is present. Nearly everyone experiences a faint "normal tinnitus" in a completely quiet room; but it is of concern only if it is bothersome, interferes with normal hearing, or is associated with other problems. While often described as a ringing, it may also sound like a clicking, buzzing, hissing or roaring. It may be soft or loud, low- or high-pitched, and may seem to come from one or both ears or from the head itself. In some people, it may interfere with concentration, and in some cases is associated with anxiety and depression. 

Tinnitus is usually associated with a degree of hearing loss and decreased comprehension of speech in noisy environments. It is common, affecting about 10–15% of people. Most, however, tolerate it well, and it is a significant problem in only 1–2% of all people. It can trigger a fight-or-flight response, as the brain may perceive it as dangerous and important. The word tinnitus comes from the Latin tinnire, "to ring".

Rather than a disease, tinnitus is a symptom that may result from various underlying causes and may be generated at any level of the auditory system and structures beyond that system. The most common causes are hearing damage, noise-induced hearing loss or age-related hearing loss, known as presbycusis. Other causes include ear infections, disease of the heart or blood vessels, Ménière's disease, brain tumors, acoustic neuromas (tumors on the auditory nerves of the ear), migraines, temporomandibular joint disorders, exposure to certain medications, a previous head injury, and earwax. It can suddenly emerge during a period of emotional stress. It is more common in those with depression.

The diagnosis of tinnitus is usually based on the person's description. It is commonly supported by an audiogram, an otolaryngological and a neurological examination. The degree of interference with a person's life may be quantified with questionnaires. If certain problems are found, medical imaging, such as magnetic resonance imaging (MRI), may be performed. Other tests are suitable when tinnitus occurs with the same rhythm as the heartbeat. Rarely, the sound may be heard by someone else using a stethoscope, in which case it is known as objective tinnitus. Occasionally, spontaneous otoacoustic emissions, sounds produced normally by the inner ear, may result in tinnitus.

Prevention involves avoiding exposure to loud noise for longer periods or chronically and limiting exposure to ototoxic drugs and substances. If there is an underlying cause, treating it may lead to improvements. Otherwise, typically, management involves psychoeducation or counseling, such as talk therapy. Sound generators or hearing aids may help. No medication directly targets tinnitus.

Signs and symptoms
Tinnitus may be perceived in one or both ears, or more centrally in the head. The noise commonly occurs inside a person's head or ear(s) in the absence of auditory stimulation, similar to ringing, although in some people, it is a high-pitched whining or electric buzzing, among numerous other sounds. It may be intermittent or continuous. In some individuals, its intensity may be changed by shoulder, neck, head, tongue, jaw, or eye movements.

A specific type of tinnitus, called objective tinnitus, is characterized by hearing the sounds of one's own muscle contractions or pulse, typically a result of sounds that have been created by the movement of jaw muscles or sounds related to blood flow in the neck or face.

Course
Due to variations in study designs, data on the course of tinnitus showed few consistent results. Generally, the prevalence increased with age in adults, and the ratings of annoyance decreased with duration.

Psychological effects
Although an annoying condition to which most people adapt, persistent tinnitus may cause anxiety and depression in some people. Tinnitus annoyance is more strongly associated with the psychological condition of the person than the loudness or frequency range of the perceived sound. Psychological problems such as depression, anxiety, sleep disturbances, and concentration difficulties are common in those with strongly annoying tinnitus. 45% of people with tinnitus have an anxiety disorder at some time in their lives.

Psychological research has focused on the tinnitus distress reaction to account for differences in tinnitus severity. The research indicates that conditioning at the initial perception of tinnitus linked it with negative emotions, such as fear and anxiety.

Types
A common tinnitus classification is into "subjective and objective tinnitus". Tinnitus is usually subjective, meaning that the sounds the person hears are not detectable by means currently available to physicians and hearing technicians. Subjective tinnitus has also been called "tinnitus aurium", "non-auditory" or "non-vibratory" tinnitus. In rare cases, tinnitus can be heard by someone else using a stethoscope. Even more rarely, in some cases it can be measured as a spontaneous otoacoustic emission (SOAE) in the ear canal. This is classified as objective tinnitus, also called "pseudo-tinnitus" or "vibratory" tinnitus.

Subjective tinnitus
Subjective tinnitus is the most frequent type. It can have many causes, but most commonly it results from hearing loss. When it is caused by disorders of the inner ear or auditory nerve, it can be called otic (from the Greek word for ear). These otological or neurological conditions include those triggered by infections, drugs or trauma. A frequent cause is traumatic noise exposure that damages hair cells in the inner ear..

When there does not seem to be a connection with a disorder of the inner ear or auditory nerve, the tinnitus can be called non-otic (i.e. not otic). In some 30% of  cases, the tinnitus is influenced by the somatosensory system; for instance, people can increase or decrease their tinnitus by moving their face, head or neck. This type is called somatic or craniocervical tinnitus, since it is only head or neck movements that have an effect.

A growing body of evidence suggests that some tinnitus is a consequence of neuroplastic alterations in the central auditory pathway. These alterations are assumed to result from a disturbed sensory input, caused by hearing loss. Hearing loss could indeed cause a homeostatic response of neurons in the central auditory system, causing tinnitus.

Hearing loss
The most common cause of tinnitus is hearing loss. Hearing loss may have many different causes, but among those with tinnitus, the major cause is cochlear injury.

Ototoxic drugs also may cause subjective tinnitus, as they may cause hearing loss, or increase the damage done by exposure to loud noise. This damage may occur even at doses not considered ototoxic. More than 260 medications have been reported to cause tinnitus as a side effect. In many cases, however, no underlying cause could be identified.

Tinnitus can also occur from the discontinuation of therapeutic doses of benzodiazepines. It can sometimes be a protracted symptom of benzodiazepine withdrawal and may persist for many months. Medications such as bupropion may also cause tinnitus. In many cases, however, no underlying cause can be identified.

Associated factors 
Factors associated with tinnitus include:
 Ear problems and hearing loss:
 Conductive hearing loss
 Acoustic shock
 Loud noise or music
 Middle ear effusion
 Otitis
 Otosclerosis
 Eustachian tube dysfunction
 Sensorineural hearing loss
 Excessive or loud noise; e.g. acoustic trauma
 Presbycusis (age-associated hearing loss)
 Ménière's disease
 Endolymphatic hydrops
 Superior canal dehiscence
 Acoustic neuroma
 Mercury or lead poisoning
 Ototoxic medications
 Neurologic disorders:
 Arnold–Chiari malformation
 Multiple sclerosis
 Head injury
 Giant cell arteritis
 Temporomandibular joint dysfunction
 Metabolic disorders:
 Vitamin B12 deficiency
 Iron deficiency anemia
 Psychiatric disorders
 Depression
 Anxiety disorders
 Other factors:
 Vasculitis
 Some psychedelic drugs can produce temporary tinnitus-like symptoms as a side effect:
 5-MeO-DET
 Diisopropyltryptamine (DiPT)
 Benzodiazepine withdrawal
 Intracranial hyper or hypotension caused by, for example, encephalitis or a cerebrospinal fluid leak

Objective tinnitus
Objective tinnitus can be detected by other people and is sometimes caused by an involuntary twitching of a muscle or a group of muscles (myoclonus) or by a vascular condition. In some cases, tinnitus is generated by muscle spasms around the middle ear.

Spontaneous otoacoustic emissions (SOAEs), which are faint high-frequency tones that are produced in the inner ear and can be measured in the ear canal with a sensitive microphone, may also cause tinnitus. About 8% of those with SOAEs and tinnitus have SOAE-linked tinnitus, while the percentage of all cases of tinnitus caused by SOAEs is estimated at 4%.

Pediatric tinnitus
Children may be subject to pulsatile or continuous tinnitus, involving anomalies and variants of the vascular parts affecting the middle/inner ear structures. CT scans may be used to check the integrity of the structures, and MR scans can evaluate nerves and potential masses or malformations. Early diagnosis can prevent long-term impairments to development.

Pulsatile tinnitus 
Some people experience a sound that beats in time with their pulse, known as pulsatile tinnitus or vascular tinnitus. Pulsatile tinnitus is usually objective in nature, resulting from altered blood flow, increased blood turbulence near the ear, such as from atherosclerosis or venous hum, but it can also arise as a subjective phenomenon from an increased awareness of blood flow in the ear. Rarely, pulsatile tinnitus may be a symptom of potentially life-threatening conditions such as carotid artery aneurysm or carotid artery dissection. Pulsatile tinnitus may also indicate vasculitis, or more specifically, giant cell arteritis. Pulsatile tinnitus may also be an indication of idiopathic intracranial hypertension. Pulsatile tinnitus can be a symptom of intracranial vascular abnormalities and should be evaluated for irregular noises of blood flow (bruits).

Pathophysiology
Tinnitus may be caused by increased neural activity in the auditory brainstem, where the brain processes sounds, causing some auditory nerve cells to become overexcited. The basis of this theory is that many with tinnitus also have hearing loss.

Three reviews of 2016 emphasized the large range and possible combinations of pathologies involved in tinnitus, which result in a great variety of symptoms and specifically adapted therapies.

Diagnosis
The diagnostic approach is based on a history of the condition and an examination of the head, neck, and neurological system. Typically an audiogram is done, and occasionally medical imaging or electronystagmography. Treatable conditions may include middle ear infection, acoustic neuroma,
concussion, and otosclerosis.

Evaluation of tinnitus can include a hearing test (audiogram), measurement of acoustic parameters of the tinnitus like pitch and loudness, and psychological assessment of comorbid conditions like depression, anxiety, and stress that are associated with severity of the tinnitus.

One definition of tinnitus, as compared to normal ear noise experience, is lasting five minutes at least twice a week. However, people with tinnitus often experience the noise more frequently than this. Tinnitus can be present constantly or intermittently. Some people with constant tinnitus might not be aware of it all the time, but only, for example, during the night when there is less environmental noise to mask it. Chronic tinnitus can be defined as tinnitus with a duration of six months or more.

Audiology
Since most persons with tinnitus also have hearing loss, a pure tone hearing test resulting in an audiogram may help diagnose a cause, though some persons with tinnitus do not have hearing loss. An audiogram may also facilitate fitting of a hearing aid in those cases where hearing loss is significant. The pitch of tinnitus is often in the range of the hearing loss.

Psychoacoustics
Acoustic qualification of tinnitus will include measurement of several acoustic parameters like frequency in cases of monotone tinnitus or frequency range and bandwidth in cases of narrow band noise tinnitus, loudness in dB above hearing threshold at the indicated frequency, mixing-point, and minimum masking level. In most cases, tinnitus pitch or frequency range is between 5 kHz and 10 kHz, and loudness between 5 and 15 dB above the hearing threshold.

Another relevant parameter of tinnitus is residual inhibition, the temporary suppression or disappearance of tinnitus following a period of masking. The degree of residual inhibition may indicate how effective tinnitus maskers would be as a treatment modality.

An assessment of hyperacusis, a frequent accompaniment of tinnitus, may also be made. Hyperacusis is related to negative reactions to sound and can take many forms. One associated parameter that can be measured is Loudness Discomfort Level (LDL) in dB, the subjective level of acute discomfort at specified frequencies over the frequency range of hearing. This defines a dynamic range between the hearing threshold at that frequency and the loudness discomfort level. A compressed dynamic range over a particular frequency range can be associated with hyperacusis. Normal hearing threshold is generally defined as 020 decibels (dB). Normal loudness discomfort levels are 8590+ dB, with some authorities citing 100 dB. A dynamic range of 55 dB or less is indicative of hyperacusis.

Severity
The condition is often rated on a scale from "slight" to "severe" according to the effects it has, such as interference with sleep, quiet activities and normal daily activities.

Assessment of psychological processes related to tinnitus involves measurement of tinnitus severity and distress (i.e., nature and extent of tinnitus-related problems), measured subjectively by validated self-report tinnitus questionnaires. These questionnaires measure the degree of psychological distress and handicap associated with tinnitus, including effects on hearing, lifestyle, health and emotional functioning. A broader assessment of general functioning, such as levels of anxiety, depression, stress, life stressors and sleep difficulties, is also important in the assessment of tinnitus due to higher risk of negative well-being across these areas, which may be affected by or exacerbate the tinnitus symptoms for the individual. Overall, current assessment measures are aimed to identify individual levels of distress and interference, coping responses and perceptions of tinnitus to inform treatment and monitor progress. However, wide variability, inconsistencies and lack of consensus regarding assessment methodology are evidenced in the literature, limiting comparison of treatment effectiveness. Developed to guide diagnosis or classify severity, most tinnitus questionnaires have been shown to be treatment-sensitive outcome measures.

Pulsatile tinnitus
If the examination reveals a bruit (sound due to turbulent blood flow), imaging studies such as transcranial doppler (TCD) or magnetic resonance angiography (MRA) should be performed.

Differential diagnosis
Other potential sources of the sounds normally associated with tinnitus should be ruled out. For instance, two recognized sources of high-pitched sounds might be electromagnetic fields common in modern wiring and various sound signal transmissions. A common and often misdiagnosed condition that mimics tinnitus is radio frequency (RF) hearing, in which subjects have been tested and found to hear high-pitched transmission frequencies that sound similar to tinnitus.

Prevention

Prolonged exposure to loud sound or noise levels can lead to tinnitus. Custom made ear plugs or other measures can help with prevention. Employers may use hearing loss prevention programs to help educate and prevent dangerous levels of exposure to noise. Government organizations set regulations to ensure employees, if following the protocol, should have minimal risk to permanent damage to their hearing.

Certain groups are advised to wear ear plugs when working or riding to avoid the risk of tinnitus, caused by overexposure to loud noises such as wind noise for motorcycle riders. Occupationally this includes military personnel, musicians, DJs, agricultural, and construction workers  as they are at a greater risk compared to the general population.

Several medicines have ototoxic effects, and can have a cumulative effect that can increase the damage done by noise. If ototoxic medications must be administered, close attention by the physician to prescription details, such as dose and dosage interval, can reduce the damage done.

Management
If a specific underlying cause is determined, treating it may lead to improvements. Otherwise, the primary treatment for tinnitus is talk therapy, sound therapy, or hearing aids. There are no effective drugs that treat tinnitus.

Psychological
The best supported treatment for tinnitus is a type of counseling called cognitive behavioral therapy (CBT) which can be delivered via the internet or in person. It decreases the amount of stress those with tinnitus feel. These benefits appear to be independent of any effect on depression or anxiety in an individual. Acceptance and commitment therapy (ACT) also shows promise in the treatment of tinnitus. Relaxation techniques may also be useful. A clinical protocol called Progressive Tinnitus Management for treatment of tinnitus has been developed by the United States Department of Veterans Affairs.

Sound-based interventions
The use of sound therapy by either hearing aids or tinnitus maskers may help the brain ignore the specific tinnitus frequency. Whilst these methods are poorly supported by evidence, there are no negative effects. There are several approaches for tinnitus sound therapy. The first is sound modification to compensate for the individual's hearing loss. The second is a signal spectrum notching to eliminate energy close to the tinnitus frequency. There is some tentative evidence supporting tinnitus retraining therapy, which is aimed at reducing tinnitus-related neuronal activity. There are preliminary data on an alternative tinnitus treatment using mobile applications, including various methods including masking, sound therapy, and relaxation exercises. These applications can work as a separate device or as a hearing aid control system.

Medications
 there were no medications effective for idiopathic tinnitus. There is not enough evidence to determine if antidepressants or acamprosate are useful. There is no high-quality evidence to support the use of benzodiazepines for tinnitus. Usefulness of melatonin, as of 2015, is unclear. It is unclear if anticonvulsants are useful for treating tinnitus. Steroid injections into the middle ear also do not seem to be effective. There is no evidence to suggest that the use of betahistine to treat tinnitus is effective.

Botulinum toxin injection has been tried with some success in some of the rare cases of objective tinnitus from a palatal tremor.

Caroverine is used in a few countries to treat tinnitus. The evidence for its usefulness is very weak.

Neuromodulation
In 2020, information about recent clinical trials has indicated that bimodal neuromodulation may be a promising treatment for reducing the symptoms of tinnitus. It is a noninvasive technique that involves applying an electrical stimulus to the tongue while also administering sounds. Equipment associated with the treatments is available through physicians. Studies with it and similar devices continue in several research centers.

There is some evidence supporting neuromodulation techniques such as transcranial magnetic stimulation; transcranial direct current stimulation and neurofeedback. However, the effects in terms of tinnitus relief are still under debate.

Alternative medicine
Ginkgo biloba does not appear to be effective. The American Academy of Otolaryngology recommends against taking melatonin or zinc supplements to relieve symptoms of tinnitus, and reported that evidence for the efficacy of many dietary supplements (such as lipoflavonoids, garlic, traditional Chinese/Korean herbal medicine, honeybee larvae, and various other vitamins and minerals, as well as homeopathic preparations) did not exist. A 2016 Cochrane Review also concluded that evidence was not sufficient to support taking zinc supplements to reduce symptoms associated with tinnitus.

Prognosis
While there is no cure, most people with tinnitus get used to it over time; for a minority, it remains a significant problem.

Epidemiology

Adults
Tinnitus affects 1015% of people. About a third of North Americans over 55 experience it. It affects one third of adults at some time in their lives, whereas 10–15% are disturbed enough to seek medical evaluation.
70 million people in Europe are estimated to have tinnitus.

Children
Tinnitus is commonly thought of as a symptom of adulthood, and is often overlooked in children. Children with hearing loss have a high incidence of pediatric tinnitus, even though they do not express the condition or its effect on their lives. Children do not generally report tinnitus spontaneously and their complaints may not be taken seriously. Among those who do complain, there is an increased likelihood of associated otological or neurological pathology such as migraine, juvenile Meniere's disease or chronic suppurative otitis media. Its reported prevalence varies from 12–36% in children with normal hearing thresholds, and up to 66% in children with a hearing loss. Approximately 310% of children have been reported to be troubled by tinnitus.

See also

 Auditory hallucination
 Health effects from noise
 List of people with tinnitus
 List of unexplained sounds
 Safe listening
 Phantom vibration syndrome
 Zwicker tone

References

External links

 
 
  Alt URL
  

Audiology
Psychoacoustics
Diseases of the ear and mastoid process
Occupational safety and health
Wikipedia medicine articles ready to translate
Wikipedia neurology articles ready to translate
Symptoms